The article lists about the broadcasting rights for UEFA Euro 2000.

Broadcasters

UEFA

Rest of the world

References

UEFA Euro 2000
2000